Mitsunaga (written: 光永 or 満永) is a Japanese surname. Notable people with the surname include:

, Japanese volleyball player
, Japanese footballer

Japanese-language surnames